Yves Godimus (born 12 January 1960) is a Belgian former professional racing cyclist. He rode in the 1985 Tour de France. He most notably won the Grand Prix de Denain in 1984.

Major results

1982
 3rd Circuit de Wallonie
1983
 2nd Grand Prix d'Aix-en-Provence
 7th Le Samyn
1984
 1st Grand Prix de Denain
 2nd Binche–Tournai–Binche
 8th Grand Prix de Wallonie
 10th Le Samyn
1985
 4th Circuit des Frontières
 6th Binche–Tournai–Binche
 9th Grote Prijs Jef Scherens
 9th Grand Prix Cerami
1986
 1st Tour de la Haute-Sambre
 2nd Binche–Tournai–Binche
 3rd Grand Prix Impanis-Van Petegem
1988
 2nd Nokere Koerse
 3rd Binche–Tournai–Binche
1990
 4th Brussels–Ingooigem
 7th Binche–Tournai–Binche
 10th Omloop van de Vlaamse Scheldeboorden
1991
 8th Binche–Tournai–Binche

References

External links
 

1960 births
Living people
Belgian male cyclists
Cyclists from Hainaut (province)
People from Lobbes